Lakhanpur  is a village development committee in Parsa District in the Narayani Zone of southern Nepal. At the time of the 2011 Nepal census it had a population of 4,962 people living in 757 individual households. There were 2,611 males and 2,351 females at the time of census.

References

Populated places in Parsa District